Juan Armando Quintanilla Loredo (born April 19, 1968) is a retired long-distance runner from Mexico, who won two gold medals at the 1995 Pan American Games in Mar del Plata, Argentina: in the men's 5.000 and 10.000 metres. He competed in three consecutive Summer Olympics, starting in 1992.

External links 

 
 Profile at the ARRS
 

1968 births
Living people
Mexican male long-distance runners
Athletes (track and field) at the 1992 Summer Olympics
Athletes (track and field) at the 1996 Summer Olympics
Athletes (track and field) at the 2000 Summer Olympics
Olympic athletes of Mexico
Athletes (track and field) at the 1995 Pan American Games
Sportspeople from San Luis Potosí
Pan American Games gold medalists for Mexico
Pan American Games medalists in athletics (track and field)
Medalists at the 1995 Pan American Games
20th-century Mexican people